Arturia alcatraziensis is a species of calcareous sponge from Brazil. It is named after the Alcatrazes Islands where it was discovered.

References

alcatraziensis
Animals described in 2007
Fauna of Brazil